Lyndon Van Christie (3 August 1928 – 28 March 2020) was an Australian-born American-based jazz bassist. He earned a medical degree from Otago Medical School, New Zealand, and, while practising as a physician in Sydney from 1961, played in the local jazz scene until he moved to New York City in 1965.

In New York, he worked as chief medical resident at Yonkers General Hospital (1966–68), continued to play jazz and attended the Juilliard School of Music studying with Homer Mensch (1968–69). Christie has played with a variety of fellow jazz musicians including Ahmad Jamal, Jaki Byard, Chet Baker, Paul Winter, Buddy Rich, Toshiko Akiyoshi, Tal Farlow and many others.

In the 1970s he established a teaching position and eventually became director emeritus of jazz studies at Westchester Conservatory in New York State.

References

External links
 Profile, mville.edu; accessed 6 March 2015.

1928 births
2020 deaths
University of Otago alumni
Australian jazz double-bassists
Male double-bassists
Australian medical doctors
Australian expatriates in the United States
Place of birth missing
21st-century double-bassists
21st-century Australian male musicians
21st-century Australian musicians
Male jazz musicians
20th-century double-bassists
20th-century Australian male musicians
20th-century Australian musicians